Carlien Dirkse van den Heuvel (born 16 April 1987) is a Dutch field hockey player.

At the 2012 Summer Olympics, she competed for the Netherlands women's national field hockey team in the women's event. Fox News notes her as one of ten LGBT Olympians to medal in London.

Private life
Carlien is lesbian.

References

External links 

 

1987 births
Living people
Dutch female field hockey players
Field hockey players at the 2012 Summer Olympics
Medalists at the 2012 Summer Olympics
Olympic field hockey players of the Netherlands
Olympic gold medalists for the Netherlands
Olympic medalists in field hockey
Sportspeople from 's-Hertogenbosch
Lesbian sportswomen
LGBT field hockey players
Dutch LGBT sportspeople
Field hockey players at the 2016 Summer Olympics
Medalists at the 2016 Summer Olympics
Olympic silver medalists for the Netherlands
Female field hockey midfielders
SCHC players
21st-century Dutch LGBT people